The complex consists of a mosque, a Bathroom and an Ab anbar. Kushk Mosque is the oldest mosque in South Khorasan Province, and based on the evidence of its existing architecture, its original structure dates back to the early centuries of Islam.

Sources 

Mosques in Iran
Mosque buildings with domes
National works of Iran
Buildings and structures in South Khorasan Province
South Khorasan Province articles missing geocoordinate data